Art museums are some of the largest buildings in the world. The world's most pre-eminent museums have also engaged in various expansion projects through the years, expanding their total exhibition space.

List 
The following is a list of art museums ranked according to their gallery space where published by reliable sources.

See also 

List of art museums
 List of most-visited art museums
List of national museums
 List of single-artist museums

Notes

References 

Art Museums
Largest
Museums, art